Valinhos is a municipality (município) in the state of São Paulo, Brazil. It is the birthplace of Adoniran Barbosa. Valinhos is famous for its purple fig, the theme of its annual Fig Fest. It is part of the Metropolitan Region of Campinas. Its name means 'little valleys' in Portuguese.

History 
The city was founded on 2 December 1732 by Alexandre Simões Vieira. A passage between the villages of São Paulo and Jundiaí had been opened. The main economic foundation of the town in the 19th century was the production of coffee, figs and grapes. Later on, a railway was created to transport the products to the Port of Santos.

Since the fig has been a town's symbol, the city counsel organizes the Festa do Figo (a traditional Fig Fest, attended by more than 75,000 people yearly). The city is mainly composed by closed neighbourhoods, condominium complexes and some residential buildings. There is also a Colégio Visconde de Porto Seguro.

Geography 
Around the city are the most important highways of the state of São Paulo, which are named  Anhanguera, Bandeirantes and Dom Pedro I.  They connect all parts of the state and are considered the best highways in the country.

Economy 
Part of the greater Campinas, Valinhos hosts branches from several multinational companies; Vermeer, Wenger, Cogna Educação, Chr. Hansen, Eaton, Unilever, Schlegel-Giesse and many others. According to the magazine Exame, Valinhos is the 12th best city in Brazil in terms of life quality.

Demography 
 2018: 127,123 citizens
Population (in percentage)
 Urban 95%
 Rural 5%
Area 
 Urban 
 Rural

Health, Security and Education 

These three sections are provided by the government and are well designed in the town, as well as the children and teenagers have the chance to learn, have their free time, play some sports and are within a secure area. There are two new hospitals in the town that looks after partly two thirds of the population, where it's not paid. However, there is another one, which is private that attends the other third.

International Relations

References

Municipalities in São Paulo (state)